Triple-base may refer to:

 Triple base plan, a United States agricultural policy proposal
 Triple-base propellant, a flashless cordite